Fusarium proliferatum is a fungal plant pathogen infecting asparagus.

References

External links 
 USDA ARS Fungal Database

proliferatum
Fungal plant pathogens and diseases
Vegetable diseases
Fungi described in 1971